"Afro-Left" is a song by Leftfield, released as their seventh single.  The song was released on 12", CD and cassette on 24 July 1995. It featured Neil Cole (as Djum Djum) on vocals, and it was rumoured that the lyrics were in an unspecified African language; it was later revealed that they were simply gibberish, or "Djum Djum talk". The song reached #22 in the UK charts.

The B-side "Afro Ride", a remix of "Afro-Left", was used in the 1995 game wipE'out".

Critical reception
Pan-European magazine Music & Media wrote, "Centrefielder Djum Djum adds the Afro flavour to the "intellectual dance" with his typically African diction. All four mixes will hit clubs and specialist radio shows like a homerun."

Track listing
 12" #1
 Afro Ride 9:10
 Afro Sol 6:02
 Afro Central 7:43

 12" #2
 Afro Left 7:32
 Afro Ride 9:10
 Afro Sol 6:02

 12" EP
 Afro Sol 6:02
 Afro Ride 9:10
 Afro Central 7:43
 Afro Left 7:32 

 CD
 Afro Left 7:32
 Afro Ride 9:10
 Afro Sol 6:02
 Afro Central 7:43

 Australian CD
 Afro Left (Edit) 4:43
 Afro Left 7:32
 Afro Ride 9:10
 Afro Sol 6:02
 Afro Central 7:43

Charts

References

1995 singles
Leftfield songs